Dug may refer to:

 past tense of dig
 nipple of a female mammal
 Dug, Phagwara, a village in Kapurthala district of Punjab State, India
 Doug Pinnick (dUg), an American musician
 An alien race in Star Wars
 A talking dog in the Pixar movie Up (2009 film)
 Scots for dog
 Another name for Doug (tuber), a tuber in the Cucurbitaceae family

See also
DUG (disambiguation)